Carl Wayne Emberson (born 13 July 1973 in Epsom, Surrey) is an English retired football goalkeeper.

Career
He played in the 1990–91 Final of the FA Youth Cup with Millwall, but only ever managed to make 1 Senior first-team appearance for the club. He joined Colchester United for £25,000 in 1994, where he had previously been on loan. He enjoyed six successful seasons at Colchester United as their first choice goalkeeper making over 200 senior league and cup Appearances. He went on to play for Walsall, before moving to Luton Town where he gained automatic promotion in his first season with the club, he then moved onto  Southend United, Grays Athletic and Sutton United.

After retiring, Emberson moved to Spain, where he runs a soccer school.

It was announced on 27 June 2011, that Emberson was appointed goalkeeping coach at Bristol Rovers.

He was appointed First Team Development Coach at Luton Town on 3 July 2012. Emberson left the club in March 2013.

Honours

Club
Millwall
 FA Youth Cup Winner (1): 1991

Colchester United
 Football League Division Three Playoff Winner (1): 1997–98
 Football League Trophy Runner-up (1): 1996–97

Walsall
 Football League Division Two Playoff Winner (1): 2000–01

Luton Town
 Football League Division Three Runner-up (1): 2001–02

Grays Athletic
 FA Trophy Winner (1): 2004–05

References

External links

1973 births
Living people
English footballers
Association football goalkeepers
Millwall F.C. players
Colchester United F.C. players
Walsall F.C. players
Luton Town F.C. players
Southend United F.C. players
Grays Athletic F.C. players
Sutton United F.C. players
Sportspeople from Epsom
English Football League players
Bristol Rovers F.C. non-playing staff
Luton Town F.C. non-playing staff